Laurent Strzelczak (born 19 February 1971) is a French professional football manager and former player who played as a defender. He was most recently an assistant coach at Championnat National club Orléans. Across his playing career, he made over 360 senior appearances.

Post-playing career 
Strzelczak retired from football in 2005. He was the head coach of Bayonne's under-18 side from July 2006 to June 2007, and an assistant coach at Beauvais from July 2007 to June 2008. From July 2008 to June 2011, he worked as a scout for Athletic Bilbao. In 2011, he was briefly the head coach of Tarbes before integrating the club's managerial staff for the 2011–12 season.

From July 2012 to November 2014, Strzelczak was the head coach of Pau. In 2016, he joined Orléans as an assistant coach. He worked with four different coaches across his spell at the club before leaving in 2021 following the expiration of his contract.

Honours 
Amiens

 Coupe de France runner-up: 2000–01

References 

1971 births
Living people
Sportspeople from Bondy
French footballers
French people of Polish descent
Association football defenders
Stade Lavallois players
Toulouse FC players
Nîmes Olympique players
Amiens SC players
Wasquehal Football players
Aviron Bayonnais FC players
Ligue 2 players
Ligue 1 players
Championnat National players
Championnat National 2 players

French football managers
Tarbes Pyrénées Football managers
Pau FC managers
Championnat National 2 managers
Association football coaches
Association football scouts
Aviron Bayonnais FC non-playing staff
AS Beauvais Oise non-playing staff
Athletic Bilbao non-playing staff
Tarbes Pyrénées Football non-playing staff
US Orléans non-playing staff
Footballers from Seine-Saint-Denis